

Highest-grossing films

List of films
A list of Japanese films that are released in the Japanese box office in 2012.

The film A Letter to Momo became the first anime film to be screened at the Warsaw International Film Festival. The 2012 films Ai to Makoto and  11.25 Jiketsu no Hi: Mishima Yukio to Wakamono-Tachi will be screened in the 2012 Cannes Film Festival.

References

 2012 in Japan
 2012 in Japanese television
 List of 2012 box office number-one films in Japan

2012
Japanese
Fil